Tlamanalco is a town and municipality in Mexico State in Mexico.

References

Municipalities of the State of Mexico
Populated places in the State of Mexico